Pantographa is a genus of moths of the family Crambidae described by Julius Lederer in 1863.

Species
Pantographa acoetesalis (Walker, 1859)
Pantographa expansalis (Lederer, 1863)
Pantographa gorgonalis Druce, 1895
Pantographa idmonalis Druce, 1895
Pantographa limata Grote & Robinson, 1867
Pantographa prorogata (Hampson, 1912)
Pantographa scripturalis (Guenée, 1854)
Pantographa serratilinealis (Lederer, 1863)
Pantographa suffusalis Druce, 1895

References

Spilomelinae
Crambidae genera
Taxa named by Julius Lederer